Sardarni Bibi Susheel Kaur also referred to as Mata Susheel Kaur (died 1716) was the wife of Sikh military leader Banda Singh Bahadur, who established the first Sikh raj and the mother of his son, Ajai Singh. She was the only daughter of Maharaja Udai Singh of Chamba.

Early life and marriage 
Susheel Kaur was born as Rajkumari Susheel Kanwar to Maharaja Udai Singh. Like the princesses of her time she was trained in sword fighting, equestrianism, as well as arts and craft; she was skilled in embroidery handicraft of the Chamba Rumal. Her known physical and personal attributes describe her as being extremely beautiful, graceful and delicate. Max Arthur Macauliffe describes her as a "Goddess of Love".

Udai Singh invited Banda Singh to Chamba and following his brother Lakshman Singh's advised, proposed a wedding alliance to him. Banda Singh agreed and the wedding took place in March of 1711. Brought up as a Sahajdhari she became Sushil Kaur upon her marriage to the Banda Singh. In 1712, she gave birth to his son, Ajai Singh.

Siege of Gurdas Nangal and Confinement 
Susheel and her infant son accompanied Banda Singh when he marched with his army to Gurdas Nangal. The Sikhs defended the fort for 8 months but on December 7, 1715 the mughal army under, Abd al-Samad Khan sieged the fort and took the Sikhs along with Banda, Susheel and Ajai captive. Banda Singh was paraded in an iron cage while the remaining Sikhs were chained and brought to Delhi. In Delhi, she was separated from her husband and son and taken to the royal harem. Just like the other Sikh prisoners she remained unmoved on giving up her faith no matter what riches were promised to them. Every day for 7 days, 100 Sikh soldiers were brought out of the fort and murdered in public. On June 9, 1716 her four year son, Ajai and husband, Banda Singh were cruelly executed. Ajai Singh's heart was cut out, and thrust into his father's mouth. Ajai Singh died in his father's lap while Banda Singh's limbs were severed, his skin removed, and eyes were gouged out, and then he was killed. Recent research and the record present with the Royal Chamba family state that Susheel Kaur killed herself on 20 June 1716 after the cruel execution of her husband and son.  According to the court reporter, Mohammad Suffi, she stabbed herself to death.

References 

1716 deaths